Shane Rhodes is a Canadian poet.

Life
He graduated from the University of New Brunswick, and currently lives in Ottawa.

He is a two-time winner of the Archibald Lampman Award for poetry. In 2008, when his work The Bindery won the award, Rhodes turned over half of the $1,500 prize money to the Wabano Centre for Aboriginal Health, a First Nations health centre. At the time the award was named the Lampman-Scott Award, honouring both Archibald Lampman and Duncan Campbell Scott, and Rhodes felt that Scott's legacy as a civil servant who was responsible for some of Canada's more controversial policy legacy on First Nations issues overshadowed his work as a pioneer of Canadian poetry.

Rhodes identifies as bisexual. His work was included in John Barton and Billeh Nickerson's 2007 anthology Seminal: The Anthology of Canada’s Gay Male Poets.

Awards
 Alberta Book Award for poetry, for The Wireless Room
 2003 Archibald Lampman Award, for Holding Pattern
 2008 Lampman-Scott Award, for The Bindery
 The 2009 PK Page Founders Award for Poetry from the Malahat Review
 Winner of the 34th National Magazine Awards for poetry (2011)
 Winner of the 2018 City of Ottawa Book Award, for Dead White Men

Works
 
 
  Chapbook
  broadside

Anthologies
 New Canadian Poetry.  Even Jones, ed. Fitzhenry and Whiteside, 2000.
 
 
 
 The Best Canadian Poetry in English 2008. Stephanie Bolster, ed. Tightrope Books, 2008.
 Best Gay Poetry 2008. Lawrence Schimel, ed. A Midsummer Night’s Press: New York, 2008.
 Ghost Fishing: An Eco-Justice Poetry Anthology. Melissa Tuckey, ed. University of Georgia Press, 2018.

References

Living people
20th-century Canadian poets
Canadian male poets
University of New Brunswick alumni
Bisexual men
Writers from Ottawa
Canadian LGBT poets
20th-century Canadian male writers
1973 births
Canadian bisexual writers
20th-century Canadian LGBT people